Landesque capital is a widespread concept used to understand anthropogenic landscapes that serve important economic, social, and ritual purposes.

Etymology
The concept of landesque capital was first used in academic texts by economist Amartya Sen. It occurred in his 1959 thesis on the choice of techniques of agriculture for “underdeveloped countries”. Sen claimed that previous studies had failed to take into account the implications of such technical investments for non-wage economies with land as a dominant factor of production:

References 

Amartya Sen
Development economics
Agricultural economics